Andover is a 2017 American science fiction romantic comedy film written and directed by Scott Perlman and starring Jonathan Silverman, Jennifer Finnigan, and Scout Taylor-Compton. The film had a limited theatrical release on May 4 in Los Angeles, Phoenix, and Chicago and was released on Blu-ray, DVD, and video-on-demand in the United States on July 17, 2018.

Plot
A genetics professor's wife dies in a fire at her glass blowing studio, but he finds her brush with a few of her hairs in it.  He and his grad student assistant make a clone of her, but there are problems.  He keeps trying with slight changes to her environment.  He becomes so obsessed with trying to make the perfect match that he doesn't realize that his assistant has fallen in love with him.  Also, the life insurance adjuster isn't convinced that she really is dead.

The lab assistant then tries to clone the professor so she can have the person she loves, but he is unresponsive to her overtures.  The professor finally is able to make a clone and have it raised by the girl's original parents.  She is identical to his wife, but she says she doesn't love him.  He returns her to her parents.

Meanwhile, the life insurance adjuster accuses the professor of faking his wife's death, and offers to approve the claim on the condition that the professor gives him the $1,000,000 policy payout.  The professor kills the adjuster, then clones him.  He gets the clone drunk, and calls the police on him.  He gets to keep the payout.

The professor and grad student reconnect and realize that they should be together, but they have to deal with the professor and his former wife's clones.  Sure enough, the clones fall in love, and we know they will be as happy as the professor and his wife were.  And we know the professor and his lab assistant will be happy together too.

Cast
 Jonathan Silverman as Adam Slope
 Jennifer Finnigan as Dawn Slope
 Scout Taylor-Compton as Emma
 Richard Kind as Harold
 Beth Grant as Rebecca
 Richard Portnow as Shamus Trout
 Angela Kinsey as Helen
 Bai Ling as Professor Huan
 Steven Bauer as Father Gregory
 Thomas Q. Jones as Wyatt
 Scott Krinsky as Lester
GeorgeAnne Carden as Molly

Casting
Shannon Makhanian was the casting director as well as one of the producers.  She cast the movie Brick which was the directorial debut of Rian Johnson.

Jonathan Lipnicki from Jerry Maguire does a cameo as a college student.

Thomas Q. Jones the former running back from the Chicago Bears and Arizona Cardinals plays Dawn's ex-boyfriend Wyatt.

Jonathan Silverman and Jennifer Finnigan are married in real life.

Production
Set in Andover, Massachusetts, Andover was filmed in Los Angeles. Andover was shot in three weeks for under $300,000 under the SAG ultra-low-budget agreement. Several scenes were shot at Mountain View Cemetery in Altadena, California.

Release
Andover had its world premiere was at the 2017 Cinéfest Sudbury International Film Festival.  The US premiere was at The Orlando Film Festival and went on to screen at a number of other film festivals including the New Jersey Film Festival and the Boston Science Fiction Film Festival where Jennifer Finnigan won the Best Actor Award.

Awards and nominations 
 Best Feature Film (2017 Orlando Film Festival)
 Audience Choice Award (Orlando Film Festival)
 Best Actress Jennifer Finnigan (Orlando Film Festival)
 Best Actor Jennifer Finnigan (Boston Science Fiction Film Festival)
Richard Kind and Beth Grant were nominated for best supporting actor and actress at the Orlando Film Festival
Scott Perlman was nominated for best director and best screenplay at the Orlando Film Festival

Reception

Andover had a limited theatrical release and received mixed reviews from critics. Ben Cahlamer from Electric Bento said "With Mr. Perlman’s deft hand and the child-like wonderment that is Jonathan Silverman in the lead, you can be assured that Andover is unlike any other romantic comedy you’ve seen. Its heart leaps off the screen and reminds us that it’s okay to love and let go over and over."

The Los Angeles Times said, "This choppy film, which is saddled with a subplot about a dogged insurance agent (Richard Portnow), becomes more mechanical than emotional, leapfrogging time, logic and process as it scrambles to its too clever-by-half conclusion."

Home media
Gravitas Ventures released Andover on Blu-ray, DVD, and streaming in the US on July 17, 2018.

Soundtrack
All the songs were performed by The Pouts featuring Nadia Lanfranconi.

References

External links
 

2017 films
American science fiction films
American romantic comedy films
2010s English-language films
2010s American films